Pseudotorynorrhina is a genus of fruit and flower chafers in the beetle family Scarabaeidae.

Species
These four species belong to the genus Pseudotorynorrhina:
 Pseudotorynorrhina fortunei (Saunders, 1852)
 Pseudotorynorrhina hosoguchii Krajčik, 2007
 Pseudotorynorrhina japonica (Hope, 1841)
 Pseudotorynorrhina tonkiniana (Ruter, 1965)

References

External links

 

Cetoniinae